The 2012–13 Elitserien was the 79th season of the top division of Swedish handball. 14 teams competed in the league. The eight highest placed teams qualified for the playoffs, whereas teams 11–13 had to play relegation playoffs against teams from the second division, and team 14 was relegated automatically. Lugi HF won the regular season, but HK Drott won the playoffs and claimed their 11th Swedish title.

League table

Playoffs bracket

Attendance

References 

Swedish handball competitions